Fairy bread is sliced white bread spread with butter or margarine and covered with "Hundreds and Thousands", often served at children's parties in Australia and New Zealand. It is typically cut into triangles.

Although people had been putting hundred and thousands (or nonpareils) on bread and butter for some time, the first known reference to this dish as Fairy Bread was in the Hobart Mercury in April 1929. Referring to a party for child inmates of the Consumptive Sanitorium, the article proclaimed that "The children will start their party with fairy bread and butter and 100s and 1,000s, and cakes, tarts, and home-made cakes..."

The origin of the term is not known, but it may come from the poem 'Fairy Bread' in Robert Louis Stevenson's A Child's Garden of Verses published in 1885, and had been used for a number of different food items before the current usage.

In April 2021, the satirical group The Chaser created a fabricated online petition calling for the renaming of fairy bread, calling it "offensive", which resulted in many mainstream news stories.

In November 2021, a Google Doodle was created to celebrate fairy bread.

See also
 Hagelslag, chocolate sprinkles
 Muisjes, sugar coated anise seeds
 Vlokken, curved chocolate flakes
 List of bread dishes

References

Snack foods
Australian breads
Australian snack foods
New Zealand breads
New Zealand snack foods
Bread dishes
Australian desserts